Ethel Romig Fuller (February 26, 1883 – December 13, 1965) was Oregon's third Poet Laureate (1957–1965), and the state's first female Poet Laureate. She was also editor of The Oregonian's poetry section from the early 1930s to the late 1950s.

Biography
Fuller was born in Big Rapids, Michigan on February 26, 1883, and attended the Eastern Michigan Normal School. After visiting Oregon on vacation, she moved to Portland, Oregon in 1906 and attended the Portland Extension Center. After climbing Mount Hood, she dedicated herself to writing about the Northwest. Fuller began writing poetry in the early 1920s. She lived in both Oregon and Washington.

When Fuller found out that the Oregonian was going to discontinue publishing poetry in early 1930s, she complained to the editor, and was then hired to start the poetry column, which published poets from around the world. She wrote three published collections of her poetry, as well as lectured and read poetry on the radio. Fuller was known for helping and encouraging new poets, which is one reason Governor Robert D. Holmes nominated her to become Oregon's third Poet Laureate in 1957.

Fuller was married to Charles Fuller, an insurance salesman. She died December 13, 1965.

Bibliography
White Peaks and Green
Kitchen Sonnets (and Lyrics of Domesticity)
Skylines

References 

1883 births
1965 deaths
American women poets
People from Big Rapids, Michigan
Poets Laureate of Oregon
20th-century American poets
20th-century American women writers